Smyk is a surname in several Slavic language origins. Notable people with the surname include:

Stephen Smyk, American politician
Oleś Smyk, a pseudonym of Oles Sanin (born 1972), Ukrainian film director, actor, cinematographer, producer, musician, and sculptor

Slavic-language surnames